Divinidylle is the fifth studio album by French singer Vanessa Paradis, released on 27 August 2007 by Barclay. It was recorded between November 2005 and June 2007. Critical reception was favourable, with AllMusic suggesting that it was "likely Paradis' best album yet". The artwork for the album was designed by American actor Johnny Depp, Paradis' companion at the time.

The lead single, "Divine Idylle", was released to French radio in June 2007. According to Francophonie Diffusion, it was the most-played French single worldwide during 2007.

The track "Divine Idylle" was covered by Taiwanese singer Jolin Tsai under the title "Love Attraction" on the 2009 album Butterfly.

Track listing
 "Divine Idylle" (lyrics: Marcel Kanche, Georges Kretek, Matthieu Chedid; music: Matthieu Chedid)
 "Chet Baker" (Jean Fauque, Matthieu Chedid) (Trumpet by Ibrahim Maalouf)
 "Les Piles" (Thomas Fersen) (featuring -M-)
 "Dès que je te vois" (Matthieu Chedid)
 "Les Revenants" (Franck Monnet, Vanessa Paradis)
 "Junior suite" (Didier Golemanas, Alain Chamfort)
 "L'Incendie" (Didier Golemanas, Vanessa Paradis, Serge Ubrette, Matthieu Chedid)
 "Irrésistiblement" (Brigitte Fontaine, Matthieu Chedid)
 "La Bataille" (Franck Monnet, Vanessa Paradis)
 "La Mélodie" (Franck Monnet, Vanessa Paradis)
 "Jackadi" (Vanessa Paradis)
 "I Wouldn't Dare" (Bill Carter, Ruth Ellsworth) (Bonus track for Japan only)
 "Emmenez-moi" (Bonus track for Japan only)

+ Bonus track (on-line song)
 "Emmenez-Moi" (Charles Aznavour)

Charts

Weekly charts

Year-end charts

Certifications

References

2007 albums
Albums produced by Franck Monnet
Barclay (record label) albums
Vanessa Paradis albums